The first USS Acoma (SP-1228) was a relatively fast motorboat for the time—capable of running at 25 knots – that was leased from its owner by the United States Navy during World War I. She was outfitted as an armed section patrol craft and assigned to patrol the waterways of Newport, Rhode Island, and New Bedford, Massachusetts. She was returned to her owner at war's end.

Built in New York

Acoma (SP-1228), a section patrol motor boat, was built in 1917 by the Gas Engine & Power Co. and Charles L. Seabury Co., Morris Heights, New York; acquired by the Navy on a free lease from Theodore D. Partridge of New York City on 25 September 1917; and commissioned on 18 October 1917.

World War I service
 
Acoma was assigned to the 2d Naval District throughout her naval career. After patrolling in the vicinity of Newport, Rhode Island, she was transferred in November 1917 to the area of New Bedford, Massachusetts. The boat served there through the end of World War I.

Decommissioning
Following the armistice, Acoma was returned to her owner on 25 November 1918.

References
 
 USS Acoma (SP-1228), 1917–1918. Originally the Civilian Motor Boat Acoma
 NavSource Online: Acoma (SP 1228)

World War I patrol vessels of the United States
Patrol vessels of the United States Navy
Ships built in Morris Heights, Bronx
1917 ships